Jacksonville Armada U-23 are an American soccer team based in Jacksonville, Florida. They play in the National Premier Soccer League (NPSL), the fourth tier of the American soccer pyramid, and are part of the development system of the Jacksonville Armada FC of the North American Soccer League (NASL). They started play in 2016, replacing Jacksonville United FC in the NPSL. The team plays its home games at Jangro Stadium in Jacksonville.

As Jacksonville United FC, the club won the NPSL Championship in its first year in the 2011 season.

History
Jacksonville United FC was founded in 2010 in Jacksonville, Florida, and began play in the 2011 season of the National Premier Soccer League (NPSL), considered at the fourth tier of the American soccer pyramid. The team was owned by Barry Dixon. While the team started their first season with four straight losses, they finished the season on an 8-game winning streak through the playoffs, finally defeating the Hollywood United Hitmen to claim the NPSL Championship with a 3–2 victory on July 30, 2011, in Madison, Alabama. Tommy Krizanovic was named Jacksonville's MVP, scoring a hat-trick in the final.

In 2016, Jacksonville Armada FC of the North American Soccer League (NASL) announced they would establish an under 23 team to compete in the NPSL as part of the club's development system. Jacksonville Armada U-23 replaced Jacksonville United in the league for the 2016 NPSL season. The Armada retained head coach Pat Cannon.

Following the 2017 NASL season, the league was denied Division II sanctioning by the United States Soccer Federation and canceled its 2018 season while legal proceedings played out. During this time, many NASL teams fielded teams in the NPSL including the Jacksonville Armada. The main team took part in league play with a mix professional and amateur players while the U-23 side went on hiatus for the season.

For the 2019 NPSL season Armada U-23 returned to the league and announced Aaron Pitchkolan as the new head coach. The team reached the playoffs for the first time since 2014 but fell in the conference semifinals to eventual national champions Miami FC.

In late 2019 the club announced it would be a founding member of the NPSL's new Gulf Coast Conference, joining teams from the Gulf Coast Premier League and a returning New Orleans Jesters for the 2020 season.

On April 5, former Armada player Tommy Križanović returned to the organization as the team's third-ever head coach.

Players and Staff

Current Roster

Current Technical Staff

Head Coaches

Current Season Individual Stats

Goals

Results

Year-by-year

Honors
 2011 NPSL National Champions 
 2011 NPSL Southeast Division Champions
 2013 NPSL Southern Region Semi-Finalist
 2013 NPSL Sunshine Division Champions
 2021 NPSL Gulf Coast Conference Division Champions

References

External links
 Official site

Association football clubs established in 2010
National Premier Soccer League teams
2010 establishments in Florida
Soccer clubs in Florida